Avon High School is a public high school in Avon, Connecticut, United States, serving grades 9–12.  The principal from the 2018-2019 to 2021-2022 school year was Michael Renkawitz. The principal since the 2022-2023 school year is Dr. Stephanie Lockhart.

Demographics 
The 2019–2020 demographic profile is as follows: White 72%, Asian American 13%, Black 5%, Hispanic 5%, two or more races 4%, American Indian/Alaskan Native 0.2%, and Hawaiian Native/Pacific Islander 0%.

Renovations
The school has undergone extensive renovations over the last 20 years. The school started its latest renovation project in 2006, which was completed in the fall of 2008. The latest renovation included the addition of classrooms, a second gymnasium, a new kitchen and cafeteria, orchestra room, several media centers, and interior cosmetic changes. An indoor track and a softball field were proposed, but were canceled due to a lack of funding. The school was also renovated during 1996 and 1997. The most recent renovations (2018-2019) done to the football field and track,  replacing the grass field with turf and replacing the track.

Academics 
In order to graduate, students of the Class of 2023 and beyond must earn a minimum of 25 credits.

Awards and rankings

 Ranked number 116 as top public high school in America by Newsweek magazine 2016
 Ranked number 16 best high school in Connecticut in U.S. News & World Report rankings in 2017

Athletics 
Avon High School has an extensive athletics program that frequently earns recognition in the Central Connecticut Conference and the Connecticut Interscholastic Athletic Conference.  Several athletes have earned All-American status.

Fall

Cross country — boys and girls
Field hockey — girls
Football — boys
Soccer — boys and girls 
Volleyball — girls 
Cheerleading - boys and girls
Crew — boys and girls

Winter

Basketball — boys and girls 
Swimming and Diving — boys and girls
Ice hockey — boys (Farmington Valley Generals)
Indoor track — boys and girls 
Wrestling — boys 
Cheerleading — boys and girls

Spring

Baseball — boys
Golf — boys
Lacrosse — boys and girls 
Outdoor track — boys and girls 
Softball — girls
Tennis — boys and girls
Crew — boys and girls

Facilities for field hockey, football, cheerleading, volleyball, basketball, wrestling, track, and girls lacrosse are located at the high school. Boys lacrosse and girls tennis play at the middle school.  Soccer, softball, and cross country have home bases at the Fisher Meadow recreational facility. Baseball plays at the Buckingham recreational facility. The Swimming and Diving team practice and compete at Cornerstone Aquatics Center in West Hartford. The crew team's home base is at the Batterson Park recreational facility in Farmington, Connecticut.

The crew team has won multiple Connecticut Public Schools Rowing Association (CPSRA) state championship races, as well as many local races and titles. In the 2013 CPSRA championship, the girls' team won the Founder's Trophy for the varsity coxed four event. In the 2022 CPSRA championship, the boys' team won the Henry Petty Cup for varsity coxed four event. They often compete in the Head of the Charles Regatta. 

Avon High School's Club Sport, Ultimate Frisbee won the Division II State Championship (2015) for Ultimate Frisbee.

CIAC State Championships

Source: CIAC. http://www.casciac.org/

Notable alumni 

Will Friedle, actor
Jessica Lundy, actress
Kia McNeill, professional soccer player
David Yoo, author

References

External links 
 

Avon, Connecticut
Educational institutions established in 1958
Schools in Hartford County, Connecticut
Public high schools in Connecticut
1958 establishments in Connecticut